Remington Norman is a wine merchant and author who has written books on Burgundy and Rhone style wine. He is a two-time winner of the Andre Simon Prize.

Biography
Remington Norman was educated at Harrow School and Oxford University where he obtained Doctorate of Philosophy and taught. He opened up fine wine shops in London, England and expanded his interest to writing. He is married to Geraldine Norman and lives in Wiltshire, England.

Awards
In 1992, his book The Great Domaines of Burgundy won the Andre Simon Prize for the best wine book of its year and was awarded the gold medal of the German Gastronomic Society. His second work, Rhone Renaissance published in 1996, won the Andre Simon Award, Le Prix du Champagne Lanson and the Glenfiddich Prize.

In 1996, his contribution to wine knowledge and appreciation was recognized when he was elected to the Academie Internationale du Vin.

See also 
List of wine personalities

Bibliography
Grand Cru: The Great Wines of Burgundy Through the Perspective of its Finest Vineyards foreword by Aubert de Villaine; Kyle Cathie, London. (2010). 
The Great Domaines of Burgundy: A Guide to the Finest Wine Producers of the Cote D'or with Charles Taylor MW; Kyle Cathie (2010). London; 
Sense & Semblance: An Anatomy of Superficiality in Modern Society(2007). Founthill. 
Rhone Renaissance: The Finest Rhone and Rhone Style Wines from France and the New World  (1996). Wine Appreciation Guild. 
Cote d' Or. Die grossen Weingüter im Herzen Burgunds (1996). Hallwag Verlag.

References

Wine critics
Masters of Wine
People educated at Harrow School
Alumni of the University of Oxford
Living people
Year of birth missing (living people)